Golden Rooster for Best Supporting Actor (中国电影金鸡奖最佳男配角) is the main category of Competition of Golden Rooster Awards.Awarding to supporting actor(s) who have outstanding performance in motion pictures.

Award Winners & Nominees

1980s

1990s

2000s

2010s

2020s

References

Golden Rooster, Best Supporting Actor
Supporting Actor, Best